Rafael Souza da Silva (born 22 July 1996) is a Brazilian bobsledder. He competed in the 2018 Winter Olympics. He qualified to represent Brazil at the 2022 Winter Olympics.

References

External links

1996 births
Living people
Bobsledders at the 2018 Winter Olympics
Bobsledders at the 2022 Winter Olympics
Brazilian male bobsledders
Olympic bobsledders of Brazil